Gold for the Caesars is a 1963 peplum film starring Jeffrey Hunter and Mylène Demongeot. Originally planned as an American production, the film was later became an Italian-French international co-production after the poor box office return of King of Kings. It was shot in Italy in 1962. The film is credited to André De Toth in the United States and both De Toth and Sabatino Ciuffini in Italy. Second unit director Riccardo Freda has claimed to have shot the entire film, while De Toth biographies make little input regarding his work on the film. Actress Mylène Demongeot has also backed up that Freda had taken charge on the films set.

Plot

Cast
 Jeffrey Hunter as Lacer
 Mylène Demongeot as Penelope
 Ron Randell as Centurion Rufus
 Massimo Girotti as Pro-consul Caius Cornelius Maximus
 Giulio Bosetti as Scipio
 Ettore Manni as Luna the Celt
 Georges Lycan as Malendi the Celt
 Furio Meniconi as Dax the Gaul

Production
Gold for the Caesars was an Italian-French peplum film  produced by Joseph Fryd, Bernard Borderie and Freda's friend Attilio Riccio. The film was based on the Florence A. Seward novel of the same name. The film was originally intended to be made by MGM as early as 1961, but was put off after the box-office failure of King of Kings (1961). Fryd took over the production to make it a lower budget production in Europe. This also had the film's story drastically changed from the novel with a greater focus on the action than characterisation.

The film was shot near Terni in 1962. André De Toth is credited as the director in the American version of the film. The Italian version of the film credits Sabatino Ciuffini as the director, while De Toth is credited as the "supervising director". This would make the film Ciuffini's only directorial role. Second unit director Riccardo Freda, who is officially credited as a second unit director, stated that "I claim the whole film as mine from start to finish. The producers put De Toth aside on the second day of shooting. André De Toth did not shoot anything." In his memoirs, De Toth did not mention shooting the film nor did Anthony Slide's book De Toth on De Toth, which De Toth described the film as "a vacation, taking a breather between climbing new peaks. Unfortunately, I climbed the wrong one, and when I skied down one of the Swiss Alps, I broke my neck. And that wasn't on the schedule," which only had De Toth return to directing in 1968. Lastly, the films female lead Mylène Demongeot wrote in her own autobiography Tiroirs secrets stated that "De Toth seemed more interested in playing golf than in movies. He willingly left free ground to Riccardo Freda, who shot very spectacular scenes."

Release
Gold for the Caesars was released in Italy on March 9, 1963. It was later released in the United States as Gold for the Caesars in June 1964 where it was distributed by MGM. The film was released on DVD by Warner Archives on-demand series.

Reception
In a contemporary review, "Dale." of Variety called the film "an acceptable piece of product that may satisfy the most undemanding filmgoers" A review in the Monthly Film Bulletin noted the film had a "ragged" and "unconvincing" storyline concluding that "even if all its virtues are negative, the film is agreeable enough to watch and its swift development prevents it from becoming too tedious."

References

Footnotes

Sources

External links
 
 
 
 

1963 films
1960s historical adventure films
Peplum films
French historical adventure films
Italian historical adventure films
1960s Italian-language films
English-language Italian films
English-language French films
Films directed by Andre DeToth
Films based on historical novels
Films set in the 1st century
Films set in the Roman Empire
Films about mining
Films shot in Italy
Sword and sandal films
1960s Italian films
1960s French films